Raul Ruíz (1940/41 – 13 June 2019) was an American journalist, professor, and political activist for Chicano civil rights during the Chicano movement and for the Peace movement of the 1960s and '70s.

Biography 
Ruiz was born in El Paso, Texas but moved to Los Angeles in his teen years. He attended California State University, Los Angeles (Cal State LA) where he earned both a bachelor's degree and a master's degree. As a reporter, and editor of La Raza, Ruíz covered the Chicano Moratorium. He notably photographed the police aiming tear gas launchers at the Silver Dollar Café, where Ruben Salazar was killed. Ruiz's photo, considered an essential historical image of the Chicano movement, ran on the cover of the L.A. Times and was reproduced around the world.

Ruiz was a candidate for La Raza Unida Party, a Chicano political party. He ran for the 48th Assembly district seat in Los Angeles in 1971, gaining 8 percent of the vote. In 1972 he ran for the 40th Assembly district seat, covering East L.A., under the La Raza Unida ticket, gaining 13 percent of the vote.

Ruiz taught for many years in the department of Chicano Studies at California State University, Northridge. He died in Los Angeles on June 13, 2019.

References

American male journalists
American writers of Mexican descent
2019 deaths
1940s births
People from El Paso, Texas
California State University, Los Angeles alumni
California State University, Northridge faculty
Editors of California newspapers
Writers from Los Angeles